This was a regional NWA championship based in Japan. For the version of this title that was promoted in NWA All Star Wrestling in Canada, see NWA International Tag Team Championship (Vancouver version).

The NWA International Tag Team Championship was a National Wrestling Alliance-sanctioned title contested for in All Japan Pro Wrestling (AJPW) and Western States Sports. Prior to being used in AJPW, the title was defended in the Japan Wrestling Association (JWA). The title lasted from 1962 through 1988. It is now part of the World Tag Team Championship, also known as the "Double Cup".

Title history

List of combined reigns

By Team

By wrestler

See also

List of National Wrestling Alliance championships
Japan Wrestling Association
World Tag Team Championship
NWA International Heavyweight Championship

Footnotes

References

External links
Wrestling-Titles.com

All Japan Pro Wrestling championships
National Wrestling Alliance championships
Tag team wrestling championships
Western States Sports championships
Japan Pro Wrestling Alliance championships
International professional wrestling championships